Hystrichophora is a genus of East African flowering plants in the daisy family.

Species
There is only one known species, Hystrichophora macrophylla, native to Tanzania.

References

Flora of Tanzania
Vernonieae
Monotypic Asteraceae genera